Perelyoshino is a rural locality (a settlement) and the administrative center of Krasnenskoye Rural Settlement, Paninsky District, Voronezh Oblast, Russia. The population was 3,964 as of 2010. There are 8 streets.

Geography 
Perelyoshino is located 11 km north of Panino (the district's administrative centre) by road. Dmitriyevka is the nearest rural locality.

References 

Rural localities in Paninsky District